Sharon Bolton is a British author of mystery fiction who has also been published under the name S.J. Bolton.

Works
Bolton is the author of ten novels, including the Lacey Flint series of police procedural novels.

Lacey Flint
Lacey Flint is a female detective constable with London's Metropolitan police.

Novels
Now You See Me Bantam, 2011 
Dead Scared Bantam, 2012 
Like This For Ever Bantam, 2013  (In the US, Lost, Minotaur)
A Dark and Twisted Tide Bantam, 2014 
The Dark Orion, 2022

Novella
If Snow Hadn’t Fallen (Short Story that takes place after Now You See Me), Transworld, 2012  
Here Be Dragons (Short story that takes place after A Dark and Twisted Tide) Transworld Digital, 2016

Craftsman Trilogy

Novels

The Craftsman Trapeze, 2018 
The Buried Orion, 2022

Novella

Alive Trapeze, 2018

Other books
Sacrifice Bantam, 2008 
Awakening Bantam, 2009 
Blood Harvest Bantam, 2010 
Little Black Lies Bantam, 2015. 
Daisy In Chains Bantam, 2016 
Dead Woman Walking Bantam, 2017 
The Split Trapeze, 2020 
The Pact Trapeze, 2021 
The Fake Wife Orion, 2023

Film 

In 2016, the motion picture of Sacrifice, starring Radha Mitchell and  Rupert Graves, and directed by Peter A. Dowling, was released by Luminous Pictures.

Awards
Bolton's second novel, Awakening, won the 2010 Mary Higgins Clark Award. Blood Harvest, her third book, was shortlisted for the 2010 Crime Writers Association's (CWA) Gold Dagger Award.  In 2014, she won the CWA's Dagger in the Library award for her body of work.

References

English crime fiction writers
Year of birth missing (living people)
Living people